Louis Vigouroux (25 August 1865 – 16 November 1956) was a French economist and politician who was a national deputy from 1900 to 1910. 
He had liberal views, which he expressed in various books and magazine articles.

Life

Louis Vigouroux was born on 25 August 1865 in Le Puy-en-Velay, Haute-Loire.
He studied classics at the Lycée du Puy, then studied at the Faculty of Law in Paris, earning his license in 1891.
He became a Professor of Political and Industrial Economics at the Free College of Social Sciences.
For two years he also headed the section of financial studies of the Crédit Lyonnais.
He held liberal views, which were expressed in his contributions to the Nouveau dictionnaire d'économie politique published in 1890 under the direction of Léon Say and Joseph Chailley, works for the Liberal Association for the Defense of Labor and French trade, and articles in the Monde économique, Journal des économistes and Revue politique et parlementaire, among others.

Louis Vigouroux undertook many study tours for the Musée social, including  England, Greece, Algeria, United States, Canada (1896), South Africa (1897-1898), Australia and New Zealand.
Paul de Rousiers led a team in the US from July to December 1896 that included F. de Carbonnel, Pierre Claudio-Jannet and Louis Vigouroux.
This resulted in several articles and two books, La Concentration des forces ouvrières dans l'Amérique du Nord by Vigouroux and Les Industries monopolisées (trusts) aux Etats-Unis by de Rousiers.
Vigouroux also published L'évolution sociale en Australie in 1902.

Louis Vigouroux ran for election as deputy for Haute-Loire on the Gauche démocratique platform on 16 September 1900.
He ran for the first constituency of Le Puy in the by-election after the incumbent Charles Dupuy had been elected senator, and won in the first round.
He was reelected on the same platform on 27 April 1902 and 20 May 1906.
Vigouroux was a moderate republican and sat with the democratic left.
He belonged to the committees on Agriculture, Trade & Industry, External Affairs and Protectorates & Colonies.
He often acted as rapporteur.
In the election of 24 April 1910 he was beaten in the first round by Joseph Boutaud.
He left office on 31 May 1910.

Louis Vigouroux was a member of the French Association for the Advancement of Science, the Society of Political Economy, and the Society of Commercial Geography.
Louis Vigouroux died on 16 November 1956 in Paris.

Publications

Publications by Louis Vigouroux, other than parliamentary proposals and reports, include:

Notes

Sources

1865 births
1956 deaths
People from Le Puy-en-Velay
Politicians from Auvergne-Rhône-Alpes
Democratic Republican Alliance politicians
Members of the 7th Chamber of Deputies of the French Third Republic
Members of the 8th Chamber of Deputies of the French Third Republic
Members of the 4th Chamber of Deputies of the French Third Republic